Carl Gustav Jablonsky (1756 – 25 May 1787) was a Berlin naturalist, entomologist and illustrator. He was also the private secretary to the Queen of Prussia, Elisabeth Christine of Brunswick-Wolfenbüttel-Bevern. He died at the age of 31. He willed his works to his colleague, Johann Friedrich Wilhelm Herbst , who became a naturalist and entomologist.

Jablonsky's Natursystem is one of the first attempts at a complete survey of the order Coleoptera.

Works
With Johann Friedrich Wilhelm Herbst, Natursystem aller bekannten in- und ausländischen Insecten, als eine Fortzetsung der von Büffonschen Naturgeschichte. Nach dem System des Ritters Carl von Linné bearbeitet: Käfer

References

External links
Plates from Natursystem Insekten:Käfer at the University of Copenhagen library
Zoologica Göttingen State and University Library Digitised Natursystem Insekten

1756 births
1787 deaths
German entomologists
German naturalists
Coleopterists